Vicki Jean Peters (born September 9, 1950) is an American model and former actress. She made her film debut in the exploitation film Blood Mania (1970), and was Playboy magazine's Playmate of the Month for its April 1972 issue.

Early life
Peters was born in Minneapolis, Minnesota to Joseph Blair Peters and Emogene Maybell Taylor.  She spent her early life there and in St. Paul.

Career
In 1968, Peters relocated from St. Paul to Los Angeles, California, hoping to begin a career as an actress.  In 1970, Peters appeared in the film Blood Mania, along with fellow Playboy playmate Reagan Wilson (October 1967). In 1971, she had a walk-on part in the horror film The Cult (1971).

She was Playboy magazine's Playmate of the Month for its April 1972 issue. Her centerfold was photographed by Mario Casilli. In her interview with the magazine, Peters revealed she had abandoned her acting career and was working at photographer Harry Philmore Langdon Jr.'s (son of Harry Langdon) studio.

Personal life
Peters married film producer Jeffrey Konvitz in 1980. She has a daughter with him, Kristen Nicole, born in 1983. They divorced in 1988.

Filmography

References

External links
 
 

1950 births
Actresses from Minneapolis
American female models
Female models from Minnesota
Living people
1970s Playboy Playmates
21st-century American women